The Du Pont Story is a 1950 American historical drama film directed by Wilhelm Thiele and starring Eduard Franz, Marcel Journet and Sigrid Gurie.

Plot

Cast
 Eduard Franz as Éleuthère Irénée du Pont
 Marcel Journet as Col. Louis de Tousard
 Sigrid Gurie as Sophie du Pont  
 Grandon Rhodes as President Thomas Jefferson
 Walter Sande as Tom Cooper 
 André Charlot as Peter Bauduy  
 Tom Neal as Alfred V. du Pont  
 Stanley Ridges as Gen. Henry du Pont 
 Edmon Ryan as Lammot du Pont - the elder  
 Pierre Watkin as Col. Henry du Pont  
 Lyle Talbot as Eugene du Pont 
 David Bruce as A young du Pont  
 Nana Bryant as Elizabeth du Pont  
 Keith Richards 
 John Morgan as Francis C. du Pont  
 Peter Ortiz as Charles I. du Pont  
 James Millican as Alfred I. du Pont 
 Stuart Holmes as Dr. Alexis du Pont  
 Stacy Keach Sr. as Pierre S. du Pont  
 Douglas Kennedy as Coleman du Pont  
 Marshall Reed as Hamilton Barksdale  
 Morton C. Thompson as Francis I. du Pont  
 Ted Jacques as Amory Askell  
 Donald Woods as Irénée du Pont  
 Charles Lane as Lammot du Pont  
 Whit Bissell as Dr. Wallace Carothers  
 Art Baker as Chemical Director  
 Walter S. Carpenter Jr. 
 Crawford H. Greenewalt 
 Charles A. Cary
 Vincent Pelletier as Narrato

References

Bibliography
 Erik Christiansen. Channeling the Past: Politicizing History in Postwar America. University of Wisconsin Pres, 2013.

External links

1950 films
American biographical films
American historical films
1950s biographical films
1950s historical films
1950s English-language films
Films directed by Wilhelm Thiele
Films set in the 19th century
Films with screenplays by Wilhelm Thiele
1950s American films